Braunes Wasser (German for "brown water") is a river of Saxony-Anhalt, Germany. It flows into the Holtemme near Hasserode.

See also
List of rivers of Saxony-Anhalt

Rivers of Saxony-Anhalt
Rivers of Germany

References